Alonzo Jacob Ransier (January 3, 1834 – August 17, 1882) was an American politician in South Carolina who served as the state's first black Lieutenant Governor and later was a United States Congressman from 1873 until 1875. He was a Reconstruction era Republican.

Biography
Ransier was born a free person of color in Charleston, South Carolina. He worked as a shipping clerk until, after the Civil War, he was appointed as state registrar of elections in 1865.

In the late 1860s, he was hired by African Methodist Episcopal Church bishop and fellow future congressman, Richard H. Cain, to be an associate editor of the South Carolina Leader (renamed the Missionary Record in 1868), along with another future congressman, Robert B. Elliott.

Ransier was a member of the state constitutional convention in 1868. It authorized a public school system for the first time, as well as charitable institutions. Later in 1868, he was elected to the South Carolina House of Representatives, serving to 1869.

In 1870, Ransier was elected the 54th Lieutenant Governor of South Carolina.

He was elected from South Carolina's 2nd Congressional District to the 43rd United States Congress, where he fought for the Civil Rights Act of 1875. He also backed high tariffs and opposed a federal salary increase.  He campaigned for President Ulysses S. Grant and advocated six-year presidential terms.

After leaving Congress in 1875, Ransier was appointed by Republicans as a collector for the Internal Revenue Service.  At his death in 1882, he was working as a street cleaner in Charleston.

See also

 List of African-American United States representatives
 List of minority governors and lieutenant governors in the United Statesa

References

External links
Britannica Article
Congressional Biography
'Alonzo Ransier', African American Registry
 

1834 births
1882 deaths
African-American state legislators in South Carolina
Lieutenant Governors of South Carolina
Republican Party members of the South Carolina House of Representatives
African-American members of the United States House of Representatives
Republican Party members of the United States House of Representatives from South Carolina
American politicians of Haitian descent
American people of French descent
19th-century American politicians
African-American politicians during the Reconstruction Era